The O'PEN Skiff, or O'pen Skiff, is a sailing dinghy that was designed by Vitali Design of Italy for children's sail training and as a one design racer. It was first built in 2006.

The design is a World Sailing international class.

The boat was originally marketed by the manufacturer as the O'PEN Bic, but was renamed the O'PEN Skiff in 2019.

Production
Originally produced by Bic Sport of France starting in 2006, the design is now built by Melges Performance Sailboats in the United States and remains in production. More than 8,000 boats have been delivered.

Design
The O'PEN Skiff is a single-handed training and racing sailboat. The hull is built of thermoformed, molded polyethylene, with a two-section mast and aluminum boom. It has a catboat rig, with a K.Film polyester, fully-battened  mainsail; a raked stem, an open transom; a transom-hung, composite epoxy rudder, controlled by a tiller with an extension and a retractable, composite epoxy daggerboard. The boat displaces  and may be transported on a car top or on a trailer.

Operational history

The design is widely used by hundreds of sailing clubs for training children to sail.

Russell Coutts, World Champion New Zealand sailor and America’s Cup Winner, said of the design, "the O’pen Skiff is a fantastic boat for young sailors to experience the joy of sailing. It is fast, exciting and fun to sail yet simple to rig and maintain. Many of the skills learnt in the O’pen Skiff will be easily transferred to other boats as sailors evolve and progress onto other forms of sailing."

Racing

See also
List of sailing boat types

Similar sailboats
Optimist (dinghy)

References

External links

 

O'PEN Skiff
Classes of World Sailing
Dinghies
2000s sailboat type designs
Sailboat type designs by Vitali Design
Sailboat types built by Melges Performance Sailboats